John Blodwell, DCL was a 15th-century priest.

Blodwel was born in Llanyblodwel and educated at the University of Bologna. He held the living of Balsham in Cambridgeshire; was a Proctor of Durham and Canon of St Davids; and Dean of St Asaph from 1418 until  1441. He died at Balsham, Cambridgeshire, on 13 April 1462.

References 

15th-century Welsh clergy
Deans of St Asaph
1462 deaths
University of Bologna alumni
Clergy from Shropshire
People from Balsham
15th-century English lawyers